Bamboo can be utilized as a building material for scaffolding, bridges, houses and buildings. Bamboo, like wood, is a natural composite material with a high strength-to-weight ratio useful for structures. Bamboo's strength-to-weight ratio is similar to timber, and its strength is generally similar to a strong softwood or hardwood timber.

Bamboos are some of the fastest-growing plants in the world, due to a unique rhizome-dependent system. Certain species of bamboo can grow up to 91 cm within a 24-hour period, or nearly 4 cm/h.

Historic use of bamboo for construction
In its natural form, bamboo as a construction material is traditionally associated with the cultures of South Asia, East Asia, the South Pacific, Central and South America. In China and India, bamboo was used to hold up simple suspension bridges, either by making cables of split bamboo or twisting whole culms of sufficiently pliable bamboo together. One such bridge in the area of Qian-Xian is referenced in writings dating back to 960 AD and may have stood since as far back as the third century BC, due largely to continuous maintenance.

Bamboo has also long been used as scaffolding; the practice has been banned in China for buildings over six stories, but is still in continuous use for skyscrapers in Hong Kong. In the Philippines, the nipa hut is a fairly typical example of the most basic sort of housing where bamboo is used; the walls are split and woven bamboo, and bamboo slats and poles may be used as its support. In Japanese architecture, bamboo is used primarily as a supplemental and/or decorative element in buildings such as fencing, fountains, grates and gutters, largely due to the ready abundance of quality timber.

In parts of India, bamboo is used for drying clothes indoors, both as a rod high up near the ceiling to hang clothes on, and as a stick wielded with acquired expert skill to hoist, spread, and to take down the clothes when dry. It is also commonly used to make ladders, which apart from their normal function, are also used for carrying bodies in funerals. In Maharashtra, the bamboo groves and forests are called Veluvana, the name velu for bamboo is most likely from Sanskrit, while vana means forest. Furthermore, bamboo is also used to create flagpoles.

In Central and South America, bamboo has formed an essential part of the construction culture. Vernacular forms of housing such as bahareque have developed that use bamboo in highly seismic areas. When well-maintained and in good condition, these have been found to perform surprisingly well in earthquakes.

Modern use of bamboo round poles for construction
Over the past few decades, there has been a growing interest in using bamboo round poles for construction, primarily because of its sustainability. Famous bamboo architects and builders include Simón Velez, Marcelo Villegas, Oscar Hidalgo-López, Jörg Stamm, Vo Trong Nghia, Elora Hardy and John Hardy. To date, the most high-profile bamboo construction projects have tended to be in Vietnam, Bali (Indonesia), China and Colombia. The greatest advancements in structural use of bamboo have been in Colombia, where Universities have been conducting significant research into element and joint design and large high-profile buildings and bridges have been constructed. In Brazil, bamboo have been studied for more than 40 years at the Pontifical Catholic University of Rio de Janeiro PUC-Rio for structural applications. Some important results are the tensegrity bamboo structures, the bamboo bicycles, the bamboo space structure with rigid steel joints, the deployable bamboo structure pavilions with flexible joints  and the bamboo active bending-pantographic amphitheater structure  developed by Bambutec Design company.

Structural design codes
The first structural design codes for bamboo in-the-round were published by ISO in 2004 (ISO 22156 Bamboo - structural design, ISO 22157-1 Bamboo – Determination of Physical and Mechanical properties part 1 and ISO 22157-2 Bamboo – Determination of Physical and Mechanical properties part 2: Laboratory manual. Colombia was the first country to publish a country-specific code in the structural use of bamboo (NSR-10 G12). Since then, Ecuador, Peru, India and Bangladesh have all published codes, however the Colombian code is still widely considered to be the most reliable and comprehensive.

Curved structural shapes
Heat and pressure is sometimes traditionally used to form curved shapes in bamboo.

Structural Behaviour

A typical bamboo shows a nonlinear stress-strain behaviour. It can restrain strain of up to 0.05 until it breaks at which the stress level can be about 300 MPa.

Durability
Bamboo is more susceptible to decay than timber, due to a lack of natural toxins  and its typically thin walls, which means that a small amount of decay can mean a significant percentage change in capacity. There are three causes of decay: beetle attack, termite attack and fungal attack (rot). Untreated bamboo can last 2–6 years internally, and less than a year if exposed to water.

In order to protect bamboo from decay, two design principles are required:

 The bamboo must be kept dry throughout its life to protect it against rot (fungi). This fundamental architectural principle is called "durability by design", and involves keeping the bamboo dry through good design practices such as elevating the structure above the ground, using damp proof membranes, having good drip details, having good roof overhangs, using waterproof coatings for the walls, etc.
 The bamboo must be treated to protect it against insects (namely beetles and termites). The most common and appropriate chemical to treat bamboo is boron, normally either a mixture of borax and boric acid, but it also comes in one compound (di-sodium tetraborate decahydrate).

Both principles must be applied to a design in order to protect bamboo. Boron by itself is inadequate to protect against rot, and it will wash out if exposed to water.

Modern fixed preservatives may be used as alternatives to boron such as copper azole, however little bamboo has been reliably tested using these methods to date. In addition, they tend to be more hazardous for the treatment workers and the end user, and therefore are less appropriate for developing countries, which is where bamboo is currently mostly used.

Natural forms of bamboo treatment such as soaking in water and exposing to smoke may provide some limited protection against beetles, however, there is little evidence to show they are effective against termites and rot, and are therefore not typically used in modern construction.

Modern use of laminated bamboo for construction
Bamboo can be cut and laminated into sheets and planks. This process involves cutting stalks into thin strips, planing them flat, and drying the strips; they are then glued, pressed and finished. Long used in China and Japan, entrepreneurs started developing and selling laminated bamboo flooring in the West during the mid-1990s; products made from bamboo laminate, including flooring, cabinetry, furniture and even decorations, are currently surging in popularity, transitioning from the boutique market to mainstream providers such as Home Depot. The bamboo goods industry (which also includes small goods, fabric, etc.) is expected to be worth $25 billion by 2012. The quality of bamboo laminate varies among manufacturers and varies according to the maturity of the plant from which it was harvested (six years being considered the optimum).

Common myths and misconceptions in the use of bamboo for construction

There are a number of common myths and misconceptions surrounding the use of bamboo for construction.

Myth 1: "Bamboo is stronger than steel."
This is a very common statement, and is derived from two sources:

 Since bamboo has a strength-to-weight ratio similar to mild steel, some people conflate this with actual strength.
 A few laboratory tests have shown some parts of some species of some culms to have ultimate strengths in tension approaching mild steel (250N/mm2).

In reality though, even if some fibres of some species show relatively high strengths, following international practice, the design strength that can be safely used is closer to 5–10% of this value, to account for the variability of the strengths.

Myth 2: "Bamboo only needs to be treated to protect it from decay."
As described above, bamboo also needs to be kept dry in order to protect it from rot, and many existing bamboo structures are showing signs of rot because they did not follow the principles of durability by design.

Myth 3: "Bamboo performs well in earthquakes because it 'sways' and 'absorbs energy'."
Bamboo is a brittle material and therefore by itself unable to absorb energy in earthquakes. There is also no advantage of its low stiffness in terms of the performance of bamboo buildings in earthquakes Instead, bamboo structures are primarily good in earthquakes because:

 They tend to be light.
 Joints in bamboo buildings are able to absorb some energy.

Myth 4: "Bolted connections cannot be used in bamboo structures."
Plain bolted connections can show brittle behavior due to longitudinal splitting of bamboo culms. Providing confinement to bamboo culms at the connection zones increases resistance to this failure mode and brings significant improvement to strength and ductility.

More importantly, bolted connections display predictable yielding. This is vital for performing a rational engineered design. The bolts are also widely available, easy-to-use and versatile.

Myth 5: "Bamboo can be used as a replacement for steel in reinforcement."
This misconception stems from the original idea that bamboo is stronger than steel, and hence could simply replace steel in reinforced concrete.

In reality, bamboo does not function well as a replacement for steel in concrete for the following reasons:

 Bamboo has ≈1/30th of the capacity of high yield steel which is most commonly now used in construction, so one would need 30× extra material. There is no space for this in reinforced concrete.
 To ensure a proper connection between the bamboo and the concrete, one needs to use expensive chemicals to form the bond, which are bad for the environment.
 Concrete is unable to protect the bamboo from fungal and termite attack.
 Bamboo is a brittle material and therefore cannot itself absorb energy in an earthquake, unlike steel.
 Once all of the above are considered, concrete reinforced with bamboo has a higher environmental impact than concrete reinforced with steel.

Case studies

Bamboo was used for the structural members of the India pavilion at Expo 2010 in Shanghai. The dome is supported on 18-m-long steel piles and a series of steel ring beams. The bamboo was treated with borax and boric acid as a fire retardant and insecticide and bent in the required shape. The bamboo sections were joined with reinforcement bars and concrete mortar to achieve the necessary lengths.

Bamboo has been used successfully for housing in Costa Rica, Ecuador, El Salvador, Colombia, Mexico, Nepal and the Philippines. An appropriate way of using bamboo for housing is considered to be "bahareque encemendato", or "improved bahareque"/"engineered bahareque". This method takes the Latin America vernacular construction system bahareque (a derivative of wattle and daub and engineers it, making it considerably more durable and resistant to earthquakes and typhoons.

Cultivation

Harvesting

Bamboo used for construction purposes must be harvested when the culms reach their greatest strength and when sugar levels in the sap are at their lowest, as high sugar content increases the ease and rate of pest infestation.

Harvesting of bamboo is typically undertaken according to the following cycles:

Life cycle of the culm
As each individual culm goes through a 5–7 year life cycle, culms are ideally allowed to reach this level of maturity prior to full capacity harvesting. The clearing out or thinning of culms, particularly older decaying culms, helps to ensure adequate light and resources for new growth. Well-maintained clumps may have a productivity 3–4× that of an unharvested wild clump. Consistent with the life cycle described above, bamboo is harvested from two to three years through to five to seven years, depending on the species.
Annual cycle
As all growth of new bamboo occurs during the wet season, disturbing the clump during this phase will potentially damage the upcoming crop. Also during this high rainfall period, sap levels are at their highest, and then diminish towards the dry season. Picking immediately prior to the wet/growth season may also damage new shoots. Hence, harvesting is best a few months prior to the start of the wet season.
Daily cycle
During the height of the day, photosynthesis is at its peak, producing the highest levels of sugar in sap, making this the least ideal time of day to harvest. Many traditional practitioners believe the best time to harvest is at dawn or dusk on a waning moon.

Additional images

See also
 Bamboo bicycle
 Bamboo textiles
 International Network for Bamboo and Rattan

References

External links

 Elora Hardy: Magical houses, made of bamboo at TED
 Arup: Full-scale shake-table test of earthquake-proof housing for El Salvador
 Bambutec Design: Deployable Bamboo Structure Pavilion

Bamboo buildings and structures
Building materials